Zoe Zaoutzaina (Greek: Ζωὴ Ζαούτζαινα; died May 899) was a Byzantine empress consort as the second wife of the Byzantine emperor Leo VI the Wise. She was the daughter of Stylianos Zaoutzes (Στυλιανὸς Ζαούτζης), a high-ranking bureaucrat during the reign of her husband.

Royal mistress
The work Theophanes Continuatus was a continuation of the chronicle of Theophanes the Confessor by other writers, active during the reign of Constantine VII. According to it Zoe was first married to Theodore Gouniatzizes, an otherwise obscure member of the court. She became mistress to the Emperor after the death of her husband. Theophanes records Theodore being poisoned, implicating Leo VI in his early demise. Symeon the Metaphrast records Leo falling in love with her in the third year of his reign, placing their meeting c. 889. At the time Leo was married to Theophano, daughter of Constantine Martiniakos. Their marriage had been arranged by his father Basil I. They had a daughter but the marriage of Leo VI and Theophano seems to have been loveless.

Royal consort
In the seventh year of his reign (c. 893), Theophano retired to a monastery in the Blachernae suburb of Constantinople. Theophano is considered particularly devoted to the church throughout her life. Whether her retirement was voluntary is left vague by both Theophanes and Symeon. Zoe replaced her in the palace and court life. There is a contradiction on her particular status from c. 893 to 897. According to Symeon, the marriage of Leo VI to Theophano was officially declared void, allowing Leo and Zoe to marry within the year. According to Theophanes, the original marriage was still valid and Zoe remained the royal mistress. Both agree, however, that her father Stylianos Zaoutzes rose to the top of palace hierarchy and was even awarded the new title of basileopatōr ("father of the emperor"), which he held until his death in 899. Theophano died in her monastery on 10 November 897. According to Theophanes, Leo and Zoe proceeded to marry at this point. Both Symeon and Theophanes agree that Zoe was only crowned Augusta following the death of her predecessor.

Death
Zoe herself died in 899. According to De Ceremoniis by Constantine VII, she had given birth to at least two daughters. However, Leo VI still had no son and his succession was not secure. Symeon records her being buried in the temple of her namesake Hagia Zoe. However, De Ceremoniis mentions her buried in the Church of the Holy Apostles where Leo VI, Theophano and third wife Eudokia Baïana were also buried. Providing both references were accurate, her remains were moved from the original burial place to that of her husband.

Children
According to De Ceremoniis by Constantine VII, Leo VI and Zoe had at least two daughters. However, different copies of the text give two different names for the second one:
Anna – considered to have died young. Buried with her father and mother at the Church of the Holy Apostles.
Anna or Eudocia. Eudocia was the name of the only daughter of Leo VI and Theophano, while Anna was the name of the first daughter of Leo VI and Zoe. In either case possibly named after an already deceased half-sister or sister.

A letter written by Nicholas Mystikos mentions negotiations to betroth the second daughter to Louis the Blind. Whether negotiations were ever completed and whether the marriage ever occurred is not known. However, some genealogists consider Charles Constantine of Vienne to be the result of this marriage.

References

Sources
Theophanes Continuatus, Chronicle.
Symeon Metaphrastes, Chronicle.
Constantine VII, De Ceremoniis.

External links
Her listing along with her husband in "Medieval lands" by Charles Cawley. The  project "involves extracting and analysing detailed information from primary sources, including contemporary chronicles, cartularies, necrologies and testaments."

9th-century births
899 deaths
Macedonian dynasty
9th-century Byzantine empresses
Burials at the Church of the Holy Apostles
Mistresses of Byzantine royalty
Augustae